Queen of Sheba is a public art work by artist Alexander Archipenko located at the Lynden Sculpture Garden near Milwaukee, Wisconsin. The abstract bronze sculpture includes sloping concave forms, vaguely female curves, and a rounded crown; it is installed on the patio.

References

Sculpture by Alexander Archipenko
1961 sculptures
Outdoor sculptures in Milwaukee
Abstract sculptures in Wisconsin
Bronze sculptures in Wisconsin
1961 establishments in Wisconsin